Gerrie Stroker (12 August 1916 – 31 January 2002) was a Dutch footballer. He played in three matches for the Netherlands national football team in 1947.

References

External links
 

1916 births
2002 deaths
Dutch footballers
Netherlands international footballers
Place of birth missing
Association footballers not categorized by position